Matthew Kilroy may refer to:

 Matt Kilroy (1866–1940), baseball pitcher
 Matthew Kilroy (British Army soldier), British soldier convicted of manslaughter in the Boston Massacre